Astralis is a Danish esports organization. Best known for their Counter-Strike: Global Offensive team, they also have teams representing other games, such as FIFA , League of Legends and Rainbow Six Siege. The parent group of Astralis is the Astralis Group, who previously managed Origen and Future F.C. before the merger of all teams under the Astralis brand. Astralis Group became the first esports organization to conduct an initial public offering, and is traded as ticker ASTRLS.CO. Astralis's CS:GO team holds the most CS:GO Major Championships won at 4.

Counter-Strike: Global Offensive division

History

2018 

On January 19, Astralis entered into the ELEAGUE Major in the United States with the group stages being played in Atlanta and the playoffs in Boston. Astralis, being the previous ELEAGUE major champions, were eager to claim the title and have a wonderful start for 2018 after a good run at the previous year. However, things didn't go as expected as they started the tournament by losing to Mousesports. The Danes found themselves in a pretty tough situation, but they managed to catch up by winning the second game against their old rivals North in a classic Danish derby. On the third day of the tournament, they got upset by Fnatic as the Swedes left them with no more losses to conceive during the group stage in order to qualify. In the end, Astralis were eliminated after a surprising loss against Cloud9, the team who later went on to win the major after winning a best-of-three grand final against the tournament favourites, FaZe Clan.

In February, Kjaerbye unexpectedly left Astralis to join North. Astralis were left scrambling for a fifth player but fortunately, they were able to sign Emil "Magisk" Reif a few days later. This would mark the beginning of an astronomical rise to the top and domination over the Counter-Strike scene. After a quarter-final finish at StarSeries S4 and a semi-final loss at IEM Katowice 2018, they reached the summit after a spectacular performance at DreamHack Marseille 2018, convincingly beating FaZe Clan, Fnatic, and Natus Vincere on their way to the title. Although they lost to FaZe Clan in the grand final after a narrow 3-0 best of five series at IEM Sydney 2018, they bounced back at ESL Pro League Season 7 Finals, swiftly defeating FaZe Clan and beating Team Liquid 3–1 to grab the trophy. They continued their dominance with trophies at ECS Season 5 Finals and ELEAGUE CS:GO Premier 2018, with a semi-final loss to Natus Vincere at ESL One: Cologne 2018 in between.

Astralis then crowned their era with their second Major title at FACEIT Major: London 2018, quickly beating FaZe Clan, Team Liquid, and Natus Vincere without dropping a single map in the playoffs. A mere 6 days later, they defeated MIBR 2–1 in the grand-final at BLAST Pro Series Istanbul 2018 - after having an undefeated 5-0 group stage - to continue their dominance over the scene. This dominance was brought on through meta-defining coordination and utility usage, significantly leading in average utility damage per round.

2019 

At the IEM Katowice Major 2019, they picked up their third Major title, becoming the second team in CS:GO history (after Fnatic) to take home three Major titles, and the third to win two majors back-to-back. They made it into the New Champions stage after a convincing 3–0 score in the New Legends stage, beating Complexity Gaming, Cloud9 and Renegades. They then went through the New Champions stage without dropping a single map, beating Ninjas in Pyjamas, MIBR, and finally ENCE to secure the Major win.

Their dominance dropped off considerably after the IEM Katowice Major 2019, and had their spot taken by Team Liquid who had become the number one CS:GO team in the world.

Later on that August, Astralis attended the StarLadder Major: Berlin 2019. After winning their opening match against DreamEaters and G2 Esports, they lost their next match against NRG Esports, making history as they had the longest match in major history, 59 rounds in total.  After losing to NRG, they defeated CR4ZY and proceeded to the playoffs. Astralis faced off Team Liquid in the Quarterfinals, and after a surprising map pick, they won the series convincingly. They once again faced off against NRG Esports in the semifinals and won the series. Finally, Astralis faced off against Avangar in the Grand Finals. Astralis won the series dominantly making them the first CS:GO team ever to win three consecutive majors, and the first team to achieve four major wins total, passing Fnatic's record of three.

In November 2019, following consistent success and multiple championships with the team, Astralis' coach zonic was honored with the "Coach of the Year Award" at the Esports Awards 2019.

2020 
On March 22, 2020, Astralis announced the organisation was expanding the roster beyond the main five players, something unprecedented for CSGO teams at the time, signing Patrick "es3tag" Hansen from Heroic. es3tag would join Astralis following the end of his contract with Heroic on July 1. On May 11, Astralis signed a seventh player, Jakob "JUGi" Hansen, who had been benched on North until then. On May 19, gla1ve, announced he was taking a break from CSGO due to stress-like symptoms, with JUGi to make his debut for Astralis. Nine days later, Xyp9x announced via Twitter that he will also go on an indefinite break to focus on his mental health. Marko "Snappi" Pfeiffer would stand-in for Xyp9x until es3tag joins the team. In July 2020, Astralis replaced JUGi with Lucas "Bubzkji" Andersen, while gla1ve returned to the active roster 4 months later.

In September 2020, Astralis Group announced the merger of all teams under the Astralis brand.

In October 2020, Astralis would field Es3tag amongst Gla1ve, Dev1ce, Magisk and Dupreeh to claim 6 successive victories in a row during the group stages of ESL Pro League S12; a series streak only tarnished by one loss with Bubzkji in Es3tag's place. Later, at the group stages, Astralis would lose to Danish rivals Heroic only to complete a lower bracket run wherein they later claimed redemption against said rivals and went on to defeat Ukrainian rivals Natus Vincere in the grand finals.

2021 
Following a change by Valve to major qualifiers to penalize 6-man rosters using mid-match substitutions, Astralis adjusted.

In April 2021, after more than five years with the team, Nicolai "dev1ce" Reedtz left the organization and was signed by Ninjas in Pyjamas. During his tenure with Astralis, dev1ce had set the record for most MVP medals in Counter-Strike history with 18.

In July 2021, gla1ve signed a new three-year contract through the summer of 2024 with Astralis. Later, Astralis completed the signing of Philip "⁠Lucky⁠" Ewald, an 18-year-old AWPer who had previously played for Tricked.

Astralis failed to reach the playoffs of the PGL Stockholm Major, leaving in the Legends group stage with one win and three losses.

On November 4, Astralis announced the addition of former Complexity duo Benjamin "⁠blameF⁠" Bremer and Kristian "⁠k0nfig⁠" Wienecke as well as Alexander "⁠ave⁠" Holdt as the new head coach. Magisk, Dupreeh, and zonic were inactive while waiting for their contracts to expire in January 2022.

2022 

In January 2022, Magisk, dupreeh, and zonic left Astralis and were signed by Team Vitality.

On January 31, 2022, ⁠Bubzkji⁠ was released from his 18-month contract with Astralis. For most of his tenure in Astralis he was on the bench and played few maps, leading to pushback from the community. Bubzkji described the internal situation as being "stranded in a battle between the players and the organization. The organization maybe wanted me to play and saw me as the future, as I was the youngest, and the team wanted to give the old five a go as they have won so much — and I totally respected that. That meant that I got stuck as I didn't want to fight the organization and I didn't want to fight the team, either, and did what was asked of me from both sides." Bubzkji went on to work for Danish broadcaster TV2. He had received offers from various teams but chose not to compete. He did not rule out returning to competition indefinitely.

On February 22, Asger "⁠Farlig⁠" Jensen was signed as the new primary AWPer, Lucky was benched.

On May 4, Phillip "Lucky" Ewald announced that he will "search for new opportunities" as his contract with Astralis is set to expire in May.

On September 20, it was announced that Kristian "k0nfig" Wienecke would miss the European Regional Major Ranking due to an injury. It was later announced on October 10 that his contract with Astralis was to be terminated, likely due to the circumstances around the injury. The team fielded Mikkel "MistR" Thomsen from the Astralis Talent roster as a stand-in for the main roster.

On October 27, Nicolai "dev1ce" Reedtz returned to Astralis under a multi-year deal after his one and a half year tenure with Ninjas in Pyjamas.

2023

On the 5th of January Astralis formally appointed Nicolai "HUNDEN" Peterson as Head Analyst after being unbanned by ESIC. This led to a lot of controversy due to circumstances surrounding his ban and how he became unbanned.

He was banned for two years in August 2021 due to allegedly leaking "sensitive" documents to opponents, and was suddenly unbanned on December 2nd following a meeting between the two parties. From HLTV: " So far, the only other thing that is now public knowledge is that ESIC deleted the original notice of sanction against HUNDEN on their website and the Dane made a point of thanking his legal team. "Matters have now been concluded on the basis of the agreed joint statement and further comments won’t be made," the 31-year-old tweeted. ESIC has also removed the original notice of charge announcement and other previous references to the case.

Astralis won CCT North Europe Series 3, an online tournament, after defeating Aurora Gaming in the grand final 2-1.

Current roster

Championships 

Bold denotes a CSGO Major

FIFA division

Current roster

League of Legends division

Current roster

Rainbow Six Siege division

Current roster

Fortnite division

Current roster

Company 

Astralis was originally founded by Danish startup RFRSH Entertainment ApS. It was split off into a wholly owned subsidiary called RFRESH Teams ApS in November 2018. Due to concerns about conflict of interest with RFRSH-owned tournament series BLAST Pro Series, RFRSH demerged Astralis In November 2019. While RFRESH was renamed into Blast ApS in July 2019, RFRESH Teams ApS renamed into Astralis Group Management ApS, which became a wholly owned subsidiary of newly established Astralis Group Holding ApS. In November 2019, Astralis Group became the first esports organization to conduct an initial public offering, with Astralis Group Holding ApS reforming as Astralis Group A/S.

Controversy

RFRSH Entertainment 
In 2019, RFRSH Entertainment experienced criticism from the Counter-Strike community over the potential conflict of interest between Astralis and BLAST Pro Series, a tournament organized by RFRSH. RFRSH formerly represented and operated Astralis's strategic and commercial operations until Summer of that year. Astralis skipped several tournaments to attend BLAST Pro Series events. This, paired with the fact that certain teams had to attend a number of BLAST events every year, caused controversy in the community. In July, RFRSH announced to split from Astralis, though some in the community still criticized RFRSH and BLAST.

FunPlus Phoenix and the signing of es3tag 
In March 2020, the Chinese organization of FunPlus Phoenix (FPX), was in the process of signing the roster of Heroic, which included es3tag, shortly before the beginning of Flashpoint 1. Astralis signed es3tag which deterred FPX from signing the rest of the Heroic roster. FPX was a founding member of Flashpoint, so the Heroic roster could not continue playing in Flashpoint and had to be replaced by a team of FPX's choosing. FPX originally intended to field the American team of Swole Patrol, but disputes over naming rights led to FPX fielding Bad News Bears instead. Astralis was criticized for knowingly signing es3tag while he was in the process of being signed by another organization and also for preventing the rest of the Heroic players from playing in Flashpoint and signing with FPX.

References

External links 
 

Counter-Strike teams
League of Legends European Championship teams
Esports teams based in Denmark
2015 establishments in Denmark
Entertainment companies of Denmark
 
Esports teams established in 2015